Henry Harbaugh Apple (November 8, 1869 – May 19, 1943) was an American clergyman and educator born in Mercersburg, Pennsylvania. He graduated from Franklin and Marshall College in 1889 and from the Theological Seminary of the Reformed Church in 1892. Ordained to the ministry of his denomination, he became pastor of St. John's Church in Philadelphia (1892) and of Trinity Church in York, Pennsylvania. In 1905 he was president of the Potomac Synod of the Reformed Church. In 1909 he was chosen president of Franklin and Marshall College.

External links
Grave at Woodward Hill Cemetery, Lancaster, Lancaster County, Pennsylvania from Find a Grave

People from Mercersburg, Pennsylvania
1869 births
1943 deaths
Franklin & Marshall College alumni
Presidents of Franklin & Marshall College